Seyyed Karam (also known as Beyt-e Seyyed Karam) is a village in Ahudasht Rural District, Shavur District, Shush County, Khuzestan Province, Iran. At the 2006 census, its population was 49, in 7 families.

References 

Populated places in Shush County